The Americas Zone was one of three zones of regional Federation Cup qualifying competition in 1992.  All ties were played at the Atlas Colomos T.C. in Guadalajara, Mexico on clay courts.

The sixteen teams were divided into four pools of four to compete in round-robin matches. After each of the ties had been played, the eight teams that finished first and second in each of the respective pools would then move on to the two-round knockout stage of the competition. The two teams that won two matches of the knockout stage would go on to advance to the World Group.

Pool Stage
Date: 21–23 April

Knockout stage

  and  advanced to World Group.

References

 Fed Cup Profile, Mexico
 Fed Cup Profile, Uruguay
 Fed Cup Profile, Trinidad and Tobago
 Fed Cup Profile, Brazil
 Fed Cup Profile, Ecuador
 Fed Cup Profile, Puerto Rico
 Fed Cup Profile, Cuba
 Fed Cup Profile, Colombia
 Fed Cup Profile, Bolivia
 Fed Cup Profile, Chile
 Fed Cup Profile, Venezuela
 Fed Cup Profile, Costa Rica

See also
Fed Cup structure

 
Americas
Sport in Guadalajara, Jalisco
Tennis tournaments in Mexico
1992 in Mexican tennis